Pawl was an American racing car constructor, who competed in three rounds of the FIA World Championship - the ,  and  Indy 500.

FIA World Championship Indy 500 results

References 

Formula One constructors (Indianapolis only)
American racecar constructors